Apotex Inc v Wellcome Foundation Ltd, [2002] 4 S.C.R. 153, is a leading Supreme Court of Canada decision on the utility requirement for a patent in Canada. The Court rejected a challenge by the generic drug manufacturers Novopharm and Apotex to declare Glaxo Wellcome's patent for AZT, an AIDS-fighting drug, invalid.

Background
Beginning in 1983, a team at Glaxo Wellcome began researching an anti-AIDS drug. The team hoped to develop a chain terminator to halt HIV in the reverse-transcription stage of its HIV life cycle. Drugs selected on the basis of their chemical structure were screened starting in 1984. 

One of the drugs screened at that time is what is now known as AZT. This drug was originally synthesized by cancer researchers in 1964, in a project that was eventually abandoned. Since that time, Glaxo Wellcome had been developing AZT as an anti-bacterial.

In vitro testing on mouse cells revealed that AZT was potentially effective against AIDS. Glaxo Wellcome was not equipped to do testing of the drug on human cell lines, so it contracted with the National Institutes of Health for this work. In February 1985, the NIH reported the positive results of their screening to Glaxo Wellcome, and, on March 16, 1985, Glaxo Wellcome filed a patent application for a new use of AZT in the United Kingdom. 

The validity of this patent was brought into question by the appellant generic drug manufacturers.

Reasons of the Court

Utility
The generic manufacturers claimed that the patent did not satisfy the utility requirement. Justice Binnie, for the Court, considered the doctrine of sound prediction to determine whether the invention was useful. There are three elements. First, there must be a factual basis for the prediction at the date that it was filed. Second, the inventor must have a sound line of reasoning from which the desired result can be inferred from the factual basis. Third, there must be proper disclosure.  As Justice Binnie believed that predictability is a question of fact, he relied on the trial judge's findings and determined that all three requirements for sound prediction were satisfied. At the time the patent application was filed, Glaxo Wellcome knew that AZT was suitable for prolonged treatment of humans, that compounds of its class could act as chain terminators, and that in vitro efficacy had been shown in human cells. 

In applying the doctrine of sound prediction, Justice Binnie noted that the doctrine is can be applied generally but that steps should be taken to ensure that it is not abused by "[dilution] to include a lucky guess or mere speculation."

Covetous Claiming
The patent claimed that AZT had both prophylactic and treatment properties. The generic manufacturers attacked the patent on the grounds that there was no sound basis to predict that the drug had any prophylactic properties. The Court did not accept this argument, instead holding that the definition of "prophylaxis" includes "prevention of the development of signs and symptoms of the disease [AIDS] without necessarily eradicating the causal factor [HIV]".

Inventorship
The generic drug manufacturers also sought to have the patent declared invalid on the grounds that the NIH researchers who did the human cell screening were not identified in the patent as co-inventors. Justice Binnie concluded that, to be considered a co-inventor, a person must have participated in the inventive concept and not merely its verification.

See also
 List of Supreme Court of Canada cases (McLachlin Court)
 Utility in Canadian patent law

External links
 
 Text of the Federal Court of Appeal decision

Supreme Court of Canada cases
2002 in Canadian case law
History of HIV/AIDS
Canadian patent case law
GSK plc litigation